Sweet Springs may refer to the following places in the United States:

Sweet Springs, Missouri
Sweet Springs, West Virginia